Nandikishore Patel, also known as Nand Kishore (born 21 January 1982) is an Indian-born Ugandan cricketer. A right-handed batsman and right arm medium-fast bowler, he played six matches for Uganda in the 2005 ICC Trophy in Ireland, and has made four first-class appearances for them in the ICC Intercontinental Cup.

External links

1982 births
Living people
Ugandan cricketers
Ugandan people of Indian descent
Gujarati people